Benjamin Sokomba Dazhi (popularly known as Benny Dee; born February 15, 1988) is a Nigerian animator.

Early life and education
Dazhi was born in Minna, the capital of Niger State, North-central Nigeria. He is a graduate of both the National Open University of Nigeria and the Federal University of Technology, Minna, where he entered the entertainment business as a rapper prior to becoming an animator.

Career
Dazhi gained recognition while working with Nigerian video director Akin Alabi as the head of animation on the movie The Legend of Oronpoto.

In September 2021, he partnered with Cartoon Network as the creator and director of the new Cartoon Network Africa animated dance series,  the CN Dance Challenge. The show instructs children in different African-inspired dance routines using two animated dance instructors, Anwuli and Kingsley.

References

1988 births
Living people
People from Niger State
Federal University of Technology, Minna alumni
National Open University of Nigeria alumni
Nigerian cinematographers